K. Babu (Malayalam: കെ .ബാബു) (born 2 June 1951 in Angamaly, Cochin, Keralam, India) is an Indian politician and the former Minister for Fisheries, Ports and Excise, Government of Kerala.  He is the representative of  Thripunithura constituency in Kerala from 1991 to 2016 and again from 2021.

Early life
K Babu was born to K.Kumaran and Ponnamma at Angamaly, Ernakulam district of Kerala. He completed his high school life in Angamaly St. Joseph school and is a degree holder from Sree Sankara College, Kalady. Mr. Babu married Geetha, they have two daughters and live near Tripunithura, Ernakulam.

Political life

Babu started his political career through the Kerala Students Union (KSU) in 1966. He was the first Chairman of Angamaly Municipal Council and the youngest Municipal Chairman then in Kerala.  Served as Director, Kerala Plantation Corporation and Kerala State Consumer Federation.  Was Vice-Chairman, Kerala University Union; President, Youth Congress Block Committee, Youth Congress District Committee (1977) and District Football Association, Ernakulam; General Secretary, Ernakulam District Congress Committee (1982–1991); General Secretary, I.N.T.U.C.; Office bearer of several Trade Unions in Kerala.  Founder of Fine Arts Society, Angamaly.  Executive Committee Member, K.P.C.C.

K Babu was elected to the Kerala Legislative Assembly for the first time in 1991 by defeating M.M. Lawrance of CPM with a margin of 4946 votes from Tripunithura constituency. It was considered a major political change in the constituency, as Tripunithura was a known Communist (Left) bastion till then. Babu has represented Tripunithura since then in the Kerala Legislative Assembly as he was re-elected in the years 1991, 1996, 2001, 2006 and 2011.

Pinarayi Vijayan of CPM alleged that Babu had won the seat with the help of BJP votes. Babu denied those allegations and stated "The allegation against me that I won the election with BJP’s votes was a smear campaign. CPM members couldn’t accept people’s verdict and the defeat of their candidate."

.

Minister
K.Babu was sworn in as a minister in Kerala for the first time in 2011. He was sworn in on 18 May 2011 as the Minister for Fisheries, Ports and Excise in the Oommen Chandy Ministry 2011-2016.

Portfolios

Excise, Ports, Harbour Engineering, Fisheries, Fisheries University, Airports, Kerala Shipping and Inland Navigation Corporation

See also
 Government of Kerala
 Kerala Ministers

References

External links

State cabinet ministers of Kerala
Living people
1951 births
Indian National Congress politicians from Kerala
Politicians from Kochi
People from Angamaly
Kerala MLAs 1991–1996
Kerala MLAs 1996–2001
Kerala MLAs 2001–2006
Kerala MLAs 2006–2011
Kerala politicians
Indian National Congress politicians